Skylines is a German streaming television drama series created by Dennis Schanz and starring Peri Baumeister, Murathan Muslu, Sahin Eryilmaz and Edin Hasanovic. Hasanovic plays Jinn, a hip-hop producer in Frankfurt, Germany, who signs to the record label Skyline Records only to find out later that it is a place where music and organized crime meet.

Skylines was released on September 27, 2019, on Netflix. It was cancelled after only one season.

Cast
 Edin Hasanovic as Jinn
 Murathan Muslu as Kalifa
 Peri Baumeister as Sara
 Anna Herrmann as Lily
 Sahin Eryilmaz as Semir
 Richy Müller as Raimund
Erdal Yildiz as Ardan
 Lisa Maria Potthoff as Celine
 Slavko Popadic as Dejan
 Carol Schuler as Zilan
 Dustin Schanz as Manuel
 Zejhun Demirov as Pezo
 Carlo Ljubek as Miro
 Sascha Nathan as Hocki
 Kasem Hoxha as Thanas Kelmendi

Episodes
All episodes were released on September 27, 2019.

References

External links

2010s drama television series
2019 German television series debuts
2019 German television series endings
German drama television series
Television shows set in Germany
German-language Netflix original programming
Grimme-Preis for fiction winners
Works about the music industry
Television series about fictional musicians
Hip hop television
German crime television series